Oliver St John, 3rd Baron St John of Bletso  (c. 1540–1618) was an English politician who sat in the House of Commons  from 1588 until 1596 when he inherited the peerage as Baron St John of Bletso.

St John was a son of Oliver St John, 1st Baron St John of Bletso, and Agnes Fisher. He was High Sheriff of Bedfordshire in 1585. In 1588 he was elected Member of Parliament for Bedfordshire. He was High Sheriff of Bedfordshire again in 1589 and was re-elected MP for Bedfordshire in 1593. He succeeded to the barony on the death of his brother John without male issue on 23 October 1596. He was Lord Lieutenant of Huntingdonshire from April 1597 until his death.

St John married Dorothy Reid, daughter of Sir John Rede or Reid, of Oddington, Gloucestershire. They had eight sons and seven daughters:
Oliver St John, 1st Earl of Bolingbroke (1580?–1646)
John St John, died young
Sir Anthony St John (c.1585 – by 1651)
Sir Alexander St John (d. 1657)
Sir Rowland St John (1588–1645)
Sir Henry St John (1590–1642)
Dudley St John, d. bef. 1618
Sir Beauchamp St John (1594–1667)
Elizabeth St John, married Sir William Beecher of Howberry
Margaret St John, married Sir Thomas Cheney of Sundon
Judith St John, married Sir John Thompson of Husborne Crawley in 1607
Anne St John, married Robert Chernock of Hulcote
Catherine St John
Dorothy St John (d. 1632), married Edward Bourchier, 4th Earl of Bath
Martha St John, married Peryam Docwra of Puckeridge

His eldest son Oliver inherited the Barony and became Earl of Bolingbroke. Of his remaining sons, John and Dudley died young, while the remaining five all became Members of Parliament.

References

  

|-

1540 births
1618 deaths
17th-century English nobility
High Sheriffs of Bedfordshire
Lord-Lieutenants of Huntingdonshire
Oliver
English MPs 1589
English MPs 1593
16th-century English nobility
Barons St John of Bletso